Luas (pronounced  ; Irish for "speed") is a tram system in Dublin, Ireland. There are two main lines: the Green Line, which began operating on 30 June 2004, and the Red Line which opened on 26 September 2004. Since then, both lines have been extended and split into different branches further out of the city. The two lines, as of 2017, now intersect and connect within Dublin city centre.

Luas is operated by Transdev, under tender from Transport Infrastructure Ireland (TII). (Prior to the later RPA merger with the National Roads Authority to form TII, the tender was originally under the defunct Railway Procurement Agency jurisdiction). The Luas was a major part of the National Transport Authority's strategy (2000–2016). Four extensions to the existing Luas lines have been completed. Construction of a  extension to the Green line to the North city centre and Broombridge, which links both Green and Red lines, began in June 2013 and opened to passengers in December 2017. This is the extension route previously known officially as BXD.

History
Following this report Córas Iompair Éireann (CIÉ), the state-owned public transport operator in Ireland, was asked to study the different options. They recommended two phases for the construction of a tram  system:

Phase 1: Tallaght to Dundrum/Balally via the City Centre
Phase 2: Ballymun to the City Centre and Dundrum/Balally to Sandyford.

The Transport Act, 1996 created a legal framework for CIÉ to build a tram  system and in May 1997 the company applied for a Light Railway Order to construct the first phase, as well as the Dundrum/Balally to Sandyford part of phase 2.

An inquiry started in July 1997, but was put on hold to investigate the possibility of underground sections in the city centre. In May 1998 the government decided to build two lines, amending the plans. The first was to run from Tallaght to Connolly Station, while the second would run from Sandyford Industrial Estate to Dublin Airport, through the city centre and Ballymun. Part of the second was to be underground through the city centre.

The responsibility for developing Luas was transferred from CIÉ to the Railway Procurement Agency (RPA), a separate government agency created in December 2001.

Construction work began in March 2001 on the Tallaght to Connolly line, as well as the Sandyford to St. Stephen's Green section of the second line, with Ansaldo of Italy and MVM of Australia getting the contract to build the system. The St. Stephen's Green to Dublin Airport section was dropped before construction began, as it was decided to serve the area by a metro instead. The contract to maintain and operate the system was awarded to Connex.

The development of Luas Red Line was facilitated by European Union funding of €82.5 million under the European Regional Development Fund, and part of the cost of some line extensions (e.g. over 50% of Line B1 to Cherrywood) was raised though levies on development in areas close to the projected route.

Launch
The original launch date for Luas was to be 2003, but delays in construction saw this date pushed back by a year. An advertising campaign took place to inform the public of the development of the system, while construction was taking place. Construction finished in February 2004 and a period of testing and driver training began. 30 June 2004 was decided on as the official launch date of the Green Line. The first tram went into service for the general public at 3 p.m. Several days of free travel and a family fun weekend took place to launch the system. The Red Line opened on 26 September 2004, with six days of free travel for the general public.

2004 to present
By November 2006, over 50 million journeys had been made on the system. Around 90,000 Luas trips are made each day. In 2007, 28.4 million journeys were made; there were 27.4 million journeys in 2008 and 25.4 million journeys in 2009. To date, the busiest day on Luas was Friday, 21 December 2007 when 145,000 passenger journeys were recorded.

Luas operates without a state subsidy. The service recorded a surplus of €985,000 (€680,000 in 2004) – an achievement well ahead of an anticipated deficit of €2.5 million.

On Tuesday, 8 December 2009 the Red Line C1 Connolly to Docklands extension opened. Construction started at the beginning of June 2007. Test runs began on the line in September 2009 before the opening.

On, 16 October 2010 the B1 extension from Sandyford to Cherrywood opened.

Luas Cross City
In June 2010, plans to join the two Luas tracks were finalised. On 20 May 2011 Dublin City Council made submissions to An Bord Pleanála's Oral Hearing into Line BXD stating that the Planning Authority had a serious area of concern with the overhead conductor system in the historical city centre asking for a wire-free zone.

Luas Cross City is an extension of the Green Line which links with the Red Line, and continues northwards to Broombridge in North Dublin (interchange with Iarnród Éireann station). The extension began at the existing St Stephen's Green Green Line stop. Construction started in June 2013, with services beginning in December 2017.

Line BX (includes Line D to Broombridge) – City Centre link for Red and Green Lines. The RPA started public consultation on the route in December 2005. In March 2007 the preferred route was announced. The route runs from St Stephen's Green to College Green where the line changes from a double track to single track. From here it runs north through Westmoreland Street, over O'Connell Bridge and along the west side of O'Connell Street to Cathal Brugha Street. It then turns east into Cathal Brugha Street and turns south to run along Marlborough Street, across the River Liffey on the Rosie Hackett Bridge, continues along Hawkins Street and College Street and joins up with the double-track section of the line at College Green. 2012 was the original completion date given in the Transport 21 plans, but construction only started in 2013. The completion date, along with the commencement of passenger services, was December 2017. The RPA applied for a Railway Order application to An Bord Pleanála for a combined Line D / Line BX Luas Line that runs from St Stephen's Green to Broombridge via the city centre and Broadstone / Grangegorman.
Line D – City Centre to Liffey Junction. This serves Grangegorman, the site of the new TU Dublin campus. This line is linked with the Maynooth line.

On 10 November 2011, the government announced in its 2012–16 Infrastructure and Capital Investment plan that the project to link the Red and Green lines, known as BXD, was to proceed. No other new lines or extensions were being funded. Construction work for the new Rosie Hackett bridge across the River Liffey (connecting Marlborough St and Hawkins St) began in April 2012, on which the southbound Luas BXD track was laid. A Railway Order was granted by An Bord Pleanála for Luas BXD line on 3 August 2012. The project was subsequently branded as Luas Cross City. Cross City opened to passengers on 9 December 2017.

Infrastructure

Stops and lines
The network currently comprises two lines:
 Green Line – Broombridge via Sandyford to Bride's Glen, 

The Red Line runs east–west through Dublin's Northside, then crosses the River Liffey and travels southwest to the heavily populated suburb of Tallaght, and then on through the Citywest campus to terminate at Saggart. It was planned, designed and constructed in two separate stages:
 Line A: Tallaght to O'Connell Street
 Line C: O'Connell Street to Connolly Station

This was followed by two extensions:
 Line C1 from Connolly to The Point, which opened in December 2009
 Line A1, the spur from Belgard to Saggart, which opened in July 2011

On the south side of Dublin city, the Green Line mostly follows the route of the old Harcourt Street railway line, which was reserved for possible reuse when it closed in 1958. It was known internally as Line B during planning and construction, and has also had several extensions:
 Line B was originally from Sandyford to St Stephen's Green.
 Line B1 is the extension from Sandyford to Bride's Glen which opened in July 2010.
 Line BX is the extension from St Stephen's Green to connect with the Red Line which opened in December 2017.
 Line D extends Line BX to Broombridge and opened simultaneously with Line BX in December 2017.
 Line B2 is a proposed extension from Bride's Glen to Bray.

The cost of building the original Red and Green Lines was €728m.
It was envisaged in the original plans that the Green Line would meet the Red Line at O'Connell Street. Plans to link the lines were announced with the proposed building of the BX Line under Transport 21: this was opened to passengers on 9 December 2017. There are 32 stops on the Red Line and 35 (plus two further unopened stations) on the Green Line.

A third line to Lucan (Line F) is planned. The line is planned to start in the city centre and travel north west to Lucan.

Track and rolling stock

The system operates on a  overhead power supply.

Both configurations of tramcars are fully compatible with both the Red and the Green Lines.

26 new 43-metre Citadis 402 trams, numbered as the '5000 Class', were ordered for delivery in early 2009. These are 100% low-floor configuration and solely operate on the Green Line, with the 4000 Class trams cascaded to the Red Line after the entire 5000 Class had been introduced.

7 further,  Citadis 402 variants were procured for use on the St. Stephen's Green – Broombridge line. They were brought into service between January and June 2018. These are numbered as members of the 5000 Class, with all existing 5000 Class units being lengthened to match. 8 further new units were ordered for delivery during 2020, with the first of those entering service in July 2020.

In other aspects, the two lines are identical except that the inter-axis width between the tracks on the Green Line is slightly wider than on the Red Line. The construction planning for the Green Line ensures a distance of track centres at  including a  extra for the kinematic envelope of metro trains. This will allow wider metro trains be run on the same tracks if a proposed upgrade to full metro service is implemented. This is possible because the route uses an old railway line and as such has few interactions with vehicular or pedestrian traffic. The Railway Procurement Agency has stated (November 2006) that "We still envisage conversion of almost all Luas lines to light metro standard in the long-term.".

The main engineering structures on the Green Line at present are Milltown Viaduct, also known as The Nine Arches, a large stone viaduct dating from 1854, and the William Dargan Bridge, a large cable-stayed bridge at Taney Cross, near Dundrum town centre.

Travel on Luas

Ticketing

Luas tickets are purple in colour and credit card sized. They bear a magnetic stripe on the back although this is not used on Luas. Uniquely among Dublin's public transport, tickets are not checked upon boarding trams; instead, a proof-of-payment system is used.

Ticket machines operate at every Luas stop and these are the only source of single-journey and return tickets. They also sell 1-day, 7-day and 30-day tickets, valid in either some or all the fare zones, for adults, children and students. Combi tickets valid on Dublin Bus and Luas are no longer on general sale, but can be purchased as commuter tickets via the "Taxsaver" scheme, as can various other combinations of bus, Luas, and Iarnród Éireann commuter train service. Certain ticket combinations are not possible (for example a one-day student ticket), and tickets can only be valid from the stop at which they are purchased and must commence their validity within 90 minutes, valid until a specific time shown on the card. Certain tickets require the user to hold an ID card and write the number on the ticket, to prevent the ticket from being transferred to another person. Ticket machines accept card payments (by American Express, MasterCard, or Visa and have a weekly limit of €150 (upper limit changed from €50 per transaction to €150 per week in January 2012 after upgrading all POS terminals to have a PIN keypad). Formerly €5 was the minimum amount which could be paid via card, but this limit has since been removed. Student tickets can be loaded to a Student Leap card, issued upon verification of student status. No other form of student identification is accepted on Luas.

Tickets cannot be purchased on board the trams. Passengers encountered by a ticket inspector and not in possession of a valid ticket or validated Leap card are issued a fine (referred to as a standard fare) of €100, reduced to €45 for prompt payment. Non-payment within 28 days may result in prosecution.

The lines are divided into 10 zones, five for the green line and four for the red, plus a shared central zone. Fares are calculated based on how many zones a journey is taken through, with a five-zone cap. There is a stop on the border of each zone, which is considered to be in whichever zone is more beneficial to the traveller. When the network opened, it was necessary to walk some distance or take another form of transport to connect between the two lines, but nowadays there is a short walking connection between O'Connell - GPO or Marlborough Street on the green line and Abbey Street on the red line.

Smartcard

In March 2005, a smartcard for Luas was launched. The smartcard was phased out following launch of the integrated Leap Card which is further detailed below. The final day of Luas Smartcard operations was on 30 September 2014. The Luas smartcard allowed travellers to pay for travel on the Luas network. Credit was pre-loaded onto the smartcard at ticket machines by cash, debit card or credit card, with a minimum top-up of €5 and a maximum credit on the card of €100, and the customer had to validate the card using readers on the platform before boarding the tram and then again after exiting the tram. This is still referred to as 'tag-on' and 'tag-off' on the current Leap Card system.

A smartcard could be purchased at a Luas ticket agent or online. The card cost €10, which included a €3 non-refundable charge for the card, €3 of credit and €4 for a fully refundable 'reserve fund' which allowed travel even if there was insufficient credit on the card for the journey. The card had to be topped up before another journey could be taken.

Smartcard fares were slightly cheaper than standard single and return fares from ticket machines. For example, a journey within a single zone cost €1.25 with the card, compared to €1.50 (€1.60 during peak time) single with a paper ticket, or €2.80 return. Daily, 7-day and 30-day tickets generally worked out cheaper, unless used only rarely. Luas smartcards were unable to store multiple-journey tickets and these tickets were issued on paper only until May 2014, since all tickets have been loaded onto the new Leap Cards.

Until January 2012 there were three different smart-card systems in Dublin: the Luas smart-card, the Dublin Bus prepaid Smartcard system for day-cards or longer and the smart-card for commuter trains and the DART which is -as the Luas card- a per journey tag on/off card but not compatible with Luas cards.

The "Leap Card" smartcard has functionality that it caps the daily and weekly spend to ensure Leap Card holders do not pay more than they would have had they bought day, weekly, or monthly tickets. This functionality had been enabled on Luas and DART services. As of 2017, the National Transport Authority reported the number of Leap Card users was 2.5 million.

Free travel
All persons in Ireland are entitled to be issued with a Public Services Card for accessing key public services and for identity purposes. Persons on the following Social Welfare
payments are provided with a Public Services Card with yellow "FT" in the top right-hand corner, which functions as a smart card in the same way as a Leap Card, but allows free travel:
 Pension (senior citizens over 66)
 Disability Allowance (persons with a disabling medical condition lasting longer than a year approved by a general practitioner, a departmental medical officer or a departmental welfare officer)
 Carers Allowance

Visitors from non-European countries to Ireland must pay full adult fare on buses, trams and trains regardless of their age or disability, and would thus be better off financially with a Leap Visitor Card set with the appropriate period pre-loaded (24 hours, 3 days, 7 days).

The free travel system was created by Ministerial Order (not an Act of the Oireachtas as with many such schemes) by then Minister for Health, Charles J Haughey in the late 1960s and is considered a 'third rail' politically.

Hours of operation and frequency

Trams operate from 05:30 to 00:30 Monday to Friday. On Saturday services run from 06:30 to 00:30, while on Sundays it is only from 07:00 to 23:30. Public holidays are the same as Sundays, except trams run until 00:30. Services run at regular intervals, from every 4–5 minutes during peak times to every 15 minutes late at night.

During the Christmas season (from early December to the last weekend before Christmas), a night service runs on Luas during Friday and Saturday nights (as well as on New Year's Eve), with the last trams departing the city centre at 03:30. However, fares are priced at a premium of €5 single (€4 on Leap Cards).

Night Luas
In 2016 while Dublin Bus was considering plans for the rolling out of its 24-hour bus service, a spokesperson for Transdev revealed that the company had looked at extending the Christmastime 'Night Luas' to operate every weekend of the year, but that "realistically, the demand for services is just not there [and that] the service just wouldn’t be financially viable."

In June 2022, Transport Minister Eamon Ryan asked the National Transport Authority to again re-examine the prospect of running Luas services on a 24-hour basis. The NTA responded by saying that a significant extension of the tram system was "not something that should be progressed at this point" noting that essential maintenance on the tram system - such as on its overhead cable systems, overhead line equipment and rail works - can only be carried out when all trams are out of service. The Authority pointed to its increased night bus services which have been coming online in recent years arguing that the delivery of 24-hour services across the bus network "is more feasible". Fine Gael TD Neale Richmond pointed out that as well as more 24-hour Dublin Bus services, late-night Luas services are "badly needed [..] given the persisting issues with access to taxis in Dublin city centre". "This is becoming a public safety issue with many people being forced to walk home, often alone, late at night as public transport is not operating and taxis are hard to come by," he added.

Accessibility

The low floors and wide spaces of the Citadis trams mean that wheelchair users can easily board. All stations have also been designed with ramps, to allow easy access. Several have lifts, such as Kilmacud and Dundrum on the Green Line, while Connolly Station has escalators that connect the Luas station to the main station building. The website for Luas also has an accessibility newsletter.

Safety

Before Luas was launched, a Safety Awareness Day was held in Dublin city centre. Thousands of reflective armbands were distributed to pedestrians and cyclists, in order to ensure their visibility for tram drivers. This policy seems to have worked as Luas has been described as being "one of the safest transport systems in the world". Both trams and stops are monitored using CCTV 24 hours a day from the central control room, located in the Red Cow Depot.

Before Luas was launched, it was feared that the tram system would lead to a high number of fatal accidents. As of 2022, however, there have been approximately 10 fatalities. There have been many occurrences of cars striking trams, mainly caused by motorists breaking red lights. On 16 September 2009, a Luas collided with a Dublin Bus at the O'Connell Street-Abbey Street Junction. In the collision, 22 people were injured, three of them seriously, including the tram driver. Early investigations suggested that the bus had the green light to move, and that the Luas must have had technical problems. The Luas driver was later charged with dangerous driving, causing harm and operating a tram in a manner which posed risk to others. He was subsequently acquitted of dangerous conduct by the Dublin Circuit Criminal Court.

Security
Security on Luas trams, platforms and facilities is provided directly by Transdev. Luas Security Officers patrol the system to counter anti-social or other incidents, and intervene in incidents prior to the arrival of the Gardaí. Luas Security Officers wear tactical uniforms and stab-resistant body vests.

Incidents and criticism
There have been several incidents involving Luas, often leading to its temporary closure. As of September 2022, this included ten fatal incidents, with approximately 540 million passengers carried.

On 17 March 2012, a fire in buildings on Benburb Street resulted in Red Line services being suspended in the city centre until 24 March 2012. Other fires in buildings adjacent to the Red Line have led to shorter closures from time to time.

On 7 November 2013 a flash fire occurred on a tram as it approached Busáras stop. There were no injuries and the damage to the Tram was minor. There had been a similar fire in 2008.

Park and ride charges have also attracted criticism. As of 2022 the cost of parking for a full day is between €2 and €5. It was described by former government Teachta Dála and head of the Dáil transport Committee Eoin Ryan as "unacceptable for Luas to charge passengers for parking at their Park and Ride facilities on top of ticket fares". On 8 February 2018 there were traffic delays in south Dublin because the longer 55 metre tram was too long for O'Connell bridge, when it was obstructed by a taxi blocking a junction.

In August 2021, the tweet, "A long-term goal of mine has been to lead a disinformation campaign which claims that the Luas is free until enough people believe it that they have no choice but to give in and make the Luas is free," by journalist Carl Kinsella, resulted in a cascade of tweets, memes and posters improperly claiming the Luas was free of charge. The consequences of the effects of the Irish Twitter had to be dealt with by Luas' workers, Transdev issuing a statement to confirm that this is not the case and ticketless travellers face a €100 fine, and a Twitter user Sally responding to the disinformation tweets online.

Accidents and deaths 
In February 2008, a 59-year-old man was struck by a tram at Cookstown Way in Tallaght, sustaining serious head injuries and dying in hospital the following day. In May 2009, a worker died at Citywest during the construction of the Luas A1 extension to Saggart. In September 2009 a Red Line Luas tram and a double-decker number 16 Dublin Bus collided at the crossing of Abbey Street and O'Connell Street in central Dublin. The front section of the tram was derailed in the incident and the driver's cabin was crushed flat against the left hand side of the bus. At least 21 people were injured and three were seriously hurt, including the driver of the tram who had to be cut out from the wreckage.

In October 2011, a 35-year-old Polish man, was struck and killed by a Red Line tram on Steevens Lane near Heuston Station. In June 2012, a 32-year-old woman was struck by a Luas tram in Inchicore, after falling onto the tracks at Blackhorse platform as a tram pulled in. She was caught between the platform and tram, and suffered severe head and body trauma. Emergency services managed to free her from under the tram, and the area was cordoned off for a forensic examination. She was rushed to hospital, and died of her injuries on 6 July 2012. As of 2019, she is the only Luas passenger (counted as a passenger, as she had intended to travel on the tram) to have died in a collision incident.

On 7 April 2014, a car collided with a Luas tram at the junction of Jervis Street and Abbey Street, and was caused to fatally strike a 35-year-old pedestrian from Dublin, who was pronounced dead at the scene. On 8 July 2017, a woman died after being struck by a city centre-bound Luas tram at St. James Walk, just past the Fatima stop, in Rialto. On 14 February 2019 a woman was struck and killed on a Tallaght bound tram between the Cookstown and Tallaght Hospital stops. She was pronounced dead at the scene. On 11 March 2019 a male pedestrian was struck and killed near the Kingswood stop. In December 2019, a male cyclist died in a collision with a tram at Peter's Place.

In September 2022, a male pedestrian aged in his 50s died after he was struck by a tram between the Cabra and Broombridge stops.

Ransomware cyberattack 
In January 2019 the website was compromised with a message threatening to "publish all data and send emails to your users" unless 1 Bitcoin was paid in five days. At the time of the attack one bitcoin was worth €3,385.

Transdev took the site offline on Thursday January 3, 2019. That afternoon they said that the records affected were those of people who had signed up to a Luas newsletter and that those people would be contacted in the next 24 hours to inform them of the breach. No financial records had been compromised. The Data Protection Commissioner and Garda National Economic Crime Bureau were both notified of the attack.

Proposed lines

Line E – In May 2008, the feasibility study for a possible Luas line E, to run from Dundrum to the City Centre via Rathfarnham, Terenure and Harold's Cross, was completed. The line was found to be feasible and it was submitted to the Minister for Transport but was rejected on being found uneconomic to operate.
Line F1/2 – City Centre to Lucan. On 27 September 2007, Noel Dempsey (Minister for Transport) launched the public consultation process for the planned Luas line to Lucan. Two main route options where identified, with a number of sub-options also identified. It was expected that would link with the proposed Metro West. The preferred route was announced in November 2008 and the RPA where planning the precise alignment and station and depot locations. The planning for the two lines was split in two. Line F1 was to be the line from Lucan to where it will connect with the existing red line at Blackhorse and Line F2 will be where the line was to leave the existing red line at James and continue on to College Green.

Luas Finglas – A  extension from Broombridge through Finglas to Charlestown Shopping Centre was announced in 2020, with a possible operating date of 2028. A public consultation was launched in July 2020. In November 2021, RTÉ News reported that the line would not be complete .

Proposed planned future extensions 

Line B2 – Cherrywood to Bray environs extension (Green Line). On 6 June 2007, the route of this Luas extension was announced. It is proposed to run from Brides Glen to Fassaroe and Bray (adjacent to the DART station), and will run very close to the M11 motorway, eventually crossing it near the Wilford interchange. This extension was postponed in 2009 due to the Post-2008 Irish economic downturn, and while it has been proposed again in the decade since, as of October 2020, the Minister for Transport, Eamon Ryan confirmed the extension will not commence in the short term.

In November 2021 the draft transport strategy for the Greater Dublin Area 2022-2042 was published. It details several extensions to existing LUAS lines, notably an extension of the Red Line to Poolbeg to be delivered before 2042. It also proposes up to 8 new lines and extensions, some previously proposed, to be delivered post-2042 with the NTA to "undertake detailed appraisal, planning and design work" in that 20 year time frame. Those lines are: 
 City Centre to Clongriffin
 City Centre to Beaumont and Balgriffin
 Green Line Extension to Tyrrelstown
 City Centre to Blanchardstown
 Red Line Reconfiguration to provide the following lines:
 Clondalkin-City Centre; 
 Tallaght-Kimmage-City Centre. 
 Tallaght to City Centre via Knocklyon; 
 Green Line Reconfiguration to provide the following lines:
 City Centre to Bray via UCD and Sandyford
 Sandyford to City Centre

The plan also examines the potential for an orbital LUAS, declaring that its alignment(s) should be specified and protected in the later half of the plan. Other upgrades to the system such as new stops, expanded depots, and improved security are also mentioned.

Other projects
Following the introduction of Luas in Dublin, there is support to bring trams  to other Irish cities. During the 2007 election campaign, Fianna Fáil and the Green Party both announced plans for tram  systems in Cork, Limerick, Galway, Waterford and Bray. The 2007 Programme for Government between these two parties and the Progressive Democrats included feasibility studies on these projects within the first two years of the government. Cork and Limerick were expected to complete their studies by "mid 2009". As a result of the financial crisis beginning in 2008, a moratorium was placed on future capital projects; as such, no feasibility studies have been completed as of 2017.

In 2018 a revived campaign for a Galway LUAS or "GLUAS" was launched receiving support Independent TD Catherine Connolly. The campaign claims a 21 km very light rail line with trains every five minutes could be installed for as little as €200 million, and make a major contribution to reducing Galway's traffic. The denial of planning permission for the Galway's second ring-road in 2022 is likely to add pressure to solve the area's traffic problems.

In May 2019, plans were revealed for a Luas-style system in Cork.

See also
Transport in Ireland
List of Irish companies
Public Transport Operators in Dublin
Dublin United Transport Company (leading pre-1950 operator of Dublin's original tram system)
Dublin Area Rapid Transit (DART)
Trams in Europe
Cork Light Rail (a similar project proposed for Cork City)

References

External links 
 Luas website
 Track plan of the Luas tram system
 Luas Cross City project
 Photos of Luas Green line(Harcourt Street)
 Rail Users Ireland Ireland's National Rail Users Group
 Hidden Dublin Photos of Luas construction
 Railway Procurement Agency
 

 
2004 establishments in Ireland
750 V DC railway electrification
Light rail in Ireland
Rail transport in Ireland
Tram transport in the Republic of Ireland
Transdev
Transport companies of the Republic of Ireland
Transport in County Dublin